Gagosian is a contemporary art gallery owned and directed by Larry Gagosian. The gallery exhibits some of the most influential artists of the 20th and 21st centuries. There are 16 gallery spaces: five in New York City; three in London; two in Paris; one each in Basel, Beverly Hills, Rome, Athens, Geneva and Hong Kong.

Development

1980s
Larry Gagosian opened his first gallery in Los Angeles in 1980. In the 1980s, the Los Angeles gallery showed the work of young contemporary artists such as Eric Fischl, Jean-Michel Basquiat and David Salle, as the New York City space mounted exhibitions dedicated to the history of The New York School, Abstract Expressionism and Pop Art by showing the earlier work of Robert Rauschenberg, Roy Lichtenstein and Willem de Kooning. In 1985, the business expanded from Los Angeles to New York. In 1986, Gagosian opened a second space on West 23rd Street in Manhattan.

1990s
In 1989, a new and more spacious gallery opened in New York City at 980 Madison Avenue with the inaugural exhibition: "The Maps of Jasper Johns."  During its first two years, the Madison Avenue space, once used by Sotheby's, presented work by Yves Klein, Andy Warhol, Cy Twombly and Jackson Pollock. Shortly after, artists such as Walter de Maria, Philip Taaffe, Francesco Clemente, and Peter Halley joined the gallery. Gagosian Gallery's second New York City location opened in the neighborhood of SoHo, then the heart of the New York art scene, in 1991. Shortly before, the gallery had wooed David Salle and Philip Taaffe from long-term relationships with the Mary Boone Gallery. The new venue served to show large-scale works by artists such as Richard Serra, Mark di Suvero, Barnett Newman, and Chris Burden. The downtown location showed younger artists such as Ellen Gallagher, Jenny Saville, Douglas Gordon and Cecily Brown. The uptown gallery maintained its commitment to historical exhibitions by showing monumental sculptures by Miró, Calder and Moore.

Andy Warhol was exhibited at both New York galleries, in collaboration with the Andy Warhol Foundation, including exhibitions of his Rorschach Paintings, Camouflage Paintings, Late Hand-Painted Paintings, Oxidation Paintings and the Diamond Dust Shadow Paintings. In 1996, The Damien Hirst exhibition "No Sense of Absolute Corruption," was the first exhibition in America to show Hirst's animals in formaldehyde tanks, a controversial series of the artist's oeuvre.

Gagosian opened a location in Beverly Hills designed by architect Richard Meier in 1995. The Beverly Hills gallery mounted exhibitions by Edward Ruscha, Nan Goldin, Frank Gehry, Jeff Koons and Richard Prince. It also showed modern artists such as Pablo Picasso, Roy Lichtenstein and Abstract Expressionism group exhibitions. To finance Koons's giant "Celebration" sculptures, a consortium of dealers, including Gagosian, spent years helping the artist line up buyers willing to prepay for them. The buyers paid $2 million to $8 million apiece to own one of the artist' car-sized sculptures of balloon dogs and candy-colored hearts.

In 1999, Gagosian Gallery moved from SoHo to West 24th Street, in New York's industrial Chelsea. Richard Gluckman designed the  gallery in which Richard Serra presented the monumental sculpture, "Switch," in November 1999.  The new space was fully completed in September. The large viewing space at West 24th Street allowed Gagosian artists, such as Richard Serra and Damien Hirst, to exhibit large scale works with great flexibility.

2000s
In spring of 2000, Gagosian became an international gallery with the opening in London of a Caruso St John-designed space on Heddon Street, near Piccadilly, then the largest commercial art gallery in London. The UK gallery inaugurated its exhibitions program with a performance by the Italian artist Vanessa Beecroft, followed by an exhibition of works by Chris Burden. In September 2000, in New York, Gagosian held the Hirst show, Damien Hirst: Models, Methods, Approaches, Assumptions, Results and Findings.

A second London Gallery, also designed by Caruso St John, on Britannia Street, opened in May 2004 with a paintings and sculpture show by Cy Twombly. Comparable to the Chelsea exhibition space in size, this addition was then the largest commercial art gallery in London. It accommodated large sculpture, video pieces and installations such as Martin Kippenberger's show, The Magical Misery Tour, Brazil. The Heddon Street location closed in July 2005, and a new storefront space on Davies Street opened simultaneously with an exhibition of Pablo Picasso prints.

To complement the West 24th Street gallery, a Richard Gluckman designed space on West 21st Street opened in October 2006. A joint exhibition with the 24th Street gallery, Cast a Cold Eye: The Late Works of Andy Warhol, launched Gagosian Gallery's second location in Chelsea and third location in New York. In 2009, the 21st Street gallery held an exhibition of Pablo Picasso's late works entitled Mosqueteros, curated by Picasso historian John Richardson.

The Madison Avenue location introduced a fifth-floor gallery space, set up to focus more on young and upcoming artists. Featuring works by Hayley Tompkins and Anselm Reyle, Old Space New Space inaugurated the space in January 2007. The fifth-floor gallery has since showcased the works of Steven Parrino, Mark Grotjahn and Isa Genzken, Dan Colen and Dash Snow, among others. From 2007 on, Gagosian Gallery has also shown at the art gallery of the Eden Rock St Barths, Saint Barthélemy, including an exhibition of Richard Prince (2007).

Gagosian opened a gallery in Rome in 2007, exhibiting new works by Cy Twombly. The Italian space is a refurbished former bank on Via Francesco Crispi, built in 1921 and redesigned by Rome-based architect Firouz Galdo in collaboration with Caruso St John. The renovation transformed the classical space into a contemporary gallery while retaining its Roman character. The main banking hall of the building had a huge bay window, and the architects have remodelled the opposite, formerly perpendicular, wall to create an oval space, with plenty of daylight coming through the windows.

In November 2008, Gagosian Gallery expanded its Madison Avenue gallery to the fourth floor, with an inaugural exhibition of works by Francis Bacon and Alberto Giacometti in Isabel and Other Intimate Strangers, in collaboration with the Giacometti Foundation and the Bacon Foundation.

Between 2003 and 2008, artists who had previously been represented by other renowned galleries joined Gagosian, such as Anselm Reyle from Gavin Brown's Enterprise; John Currin from Andrea Rosen; Mike Kelley from Metro Pictures; Tom Friedman from Feature; Takashi Murakami from Marianne Boesky; and Richard Phillips from Friedrich Petzel. On the other hand, several artists left the stable for smaller galleries, including Tom Friedman, Mark di Suvero, and Ghada Amer. The estate of Willem de Kooning went to rival Pace Gallery in 2010.

2010s
In 2010, Gagosian opened its Paris gallery on 350-square-meter (3,757 square feet) at 4, rue de Ponthieu, where it debuted with an exhibition of five new acrylic abstracts and five bronze sculptures by Cy Twombly. Priced between $4 million and $5 million each, all the paintings sold before the gallery officially opened. Located off Rue du Rhône in Geneva's business district, a 140-square-metre Art Deco space was opened as the gallery's Swiss outpost later that year.

In early 2011, the gallery, which has had a representative in Hong Kong since 2008, opened a  facility at the Pedder Building there. The outpost was inaugurated with an exhibition by Damien Hirst. That year, a survey of dealers in The Wall Street Journal estimated that Gagosian Gallery's annual sales approached $1 billion. In May 2011 alone, roughly half the works for sale by the major auction houses in New York (evening sales only) were by artists on the gallery's roster.

In October 2012, Gagosian Gallery opened a new gallery outside of Paris in Le Bourget. Designed by architect Jean Nouvel, the  space is the 12th Gagosian location worldwide.

From 2016 until 2021, Gagosian Gallery operated a space on Howard Street in San Francisco. Over the course of four years, it hosted shows by Richard Prince, Ed Ruscha, Jonas Wood, and Jay DeFeo, among others, and partnered with the Golden Gate National Recreation Area and the Golden Gate National Parks Conservancy to install two large-scale sculptures by Giuseppe Penone at Fort Mason from 2020 until 2021.

Gagosian has a global presence with 17 exhibition spaces in New York, Los Angeles, San Francisco, London, Paris, Rome, Athens, Geneva, Hong Kong and Basel, designed by world-renowned architects including Caruso St John, Richard Gluckman, Richard Meier, Jean Nouvel, Selldorf Architects, and wHY Architecture.

Further expansion
As of 2008, buyers from Russia and other republics of the former Soviet Union account for almost 50 percent of total global sales at Gagosian Gallery. Strong relationships with Russian collectors and an expanding Russian art scene, encouraged Gagosian to host temporary exhibitions in Moscow. In 2007, Insight? featured works by Jeff Koons, Damien Hirst, Willem de Kooning and Pablo Picasso, in the Barvikha Luxury Village.

In late 2011, following "Brazil: Reinvention of the Modern," a 2011 exhibition Gagosian Gallery held in its Paris outpost featuring the 1960s and '70s Neo-Concrete artists Sérgio de Camargo, Lygia Clark, Amilcar de Castro, Hélio Oiticica, Lygia Pape, and Mira Schendel, the gallery will stage a major sculpture exhibition in a warehouse in Rio de Janeiro as part of the ArtRio fair.

Since its arrival in Hong Kong in 2011 of its 26 solo exhibitions only one has featured a woman artist.

Auction records
Gagosian Gallery aims to maintain the price level of its artists by actively playing a role at art auctions. When Christie's established an auction record for Henri Matisse by selling a bronze relief for $48.8 million in 2010, it was Gagosian that bought the work. Also, Gagosian Gallery purchased Ed Ruscha's Angry Because It's Plaster, Not Milk (1965) for $3.2 million at Phillips de Pury in 2010, again establishing an auction record for that artist. Not long after joining Gagosian Gallery in 2003, the painter John Currin made his auction record of $847,500; his highest price before was a little over half that.

Legal issues

Tax evasion
In 2003, the Internal Revenue Service sued Larry Gagosian and three of his associates, accusing them of evading $26.5 million in taxes, interest and penalties on a 1990 sale of contemporary art. The IRS charged Gagosian and his partners deliberately shifted assets out of a company they created, Contemporary Art Holding Corp., to avoid paying taxes.

In May 2016, New York Attorney General Eric Schneiderman announced a $210,000 tax settlement with Gagosian Gallery director Victoria Gelfand-Magalhaes, though the settlement involved 31 works—including pieces by John Baldessari, Richard Prince and Cindy Sherman—that she had bought between 2005 and 2013 through her company Artemis, not Gagosian.

In July 2016, Gagosian Gallery agreed to a $4.28 million settlement on back taxes, interest and penalties after Schneiderman and the New York State Department of Taxation and Finance found that the company and its affiliate Pre-War Art Inc. in Beverly Hills, California, had failed to pay New York State sales tax on hundreds of art transactions from 2005 to 2015.

Copyright infringement
When French photographer Patrick Cariou launched a copyright lawsuit against Richard Prince in 2009, the suit also named as defendant Larry Gagosian, who had displayed the disputed series of painting in a show titled "Canal Zone".

Other issues
In 2009, a deal that Gagosian Gallery had struck to buy $3 million in gold bricks for the work One Ton, One Kilo by the artist Chris Burden was frozen when it turned out that the bricks had been acquired from a Houston-based company owned by financier Allen Stanford, who was later charged by the U.S. Securities and Exchange Commission and sentenced to 110 years in prison for cheating investors out of more than $7 billion over 20 years in one of the largest Ponzi schemes in US history.

In March 2011, British collector Robert Wylde sued the Gagosian Gallery for selling him  Mark Tansey painting, The Innocent Eye Test (1981), which, it turned out, had been promised to the Metropolitan Museum of Art by its owner, Jan Cowles. Shortly after, Gagosian Gallery was sued before the United States District Court for the Southern District of New York by Cowles herself, who claimed that the gallery sold another painting, Girl in Mirror (1964) by Roy Lichtenstein, from her collection in 2008–2009 without her consent.

In 2018, Steven Tananbaum brought a case to the New York Supreme Court against Gagosian Gallery and the studio of Jeff Koons over their alleged failure to deliver three works by the artist for which he had paid more than $13 million.

See also
Antwaun Sargent, a director and curator

References

External links

Larry Gagosian and Thomas Ammann to buy Hughes Warhols together

Art museums and galleries in Los Angeles
Art museums and galleries in Manhattan
Contemporary art galleries in the United States
Contemporary art galleries in France
Contemporary art galleries in London
Contemporary art galleries in Italy
Art galleries established in 1979
1979 establishments in California